Thatcheriasyrinx is a genus of sea snails, marine gastropod mollusks in the family Raphitomidae.

Species
Species within the genus Thatcheriasyrinx include:
 Thatcheriasyrinx orientis (Melvill, 1904)
Species brought into synonymy
 Thatcheriasyrinx orientalis Melvill, 1904: synonym of Thatcheriasyrinx orientis (Melvill, 1904)

References

 Powell，A．W．B． The Family Turridae in the Indo −Pacific，Part 2． The Subfamily Turriculinae， Indo −PacificMollusca ，2 （10， 207 −415 （1969 ）

External links
 P.; Kantor, Y. I.; Sysoev, A.; Puillandre, N. (2011). A new operational classification of the Conoidea (Gastropoda). Journal of Molluscan Studies. 77(3): 273-308
 
 Worldwide Mollusc Species Data Base: Raphitomidae

 
Monotypic gastropod genera
Raphitomidae